Swalwell railway station served the village of Swalwell, Tyne and Wear, England from 1868 to 1960 on the Derwent Valley Railway.

History 
The station opened in April 1868 by the North Eastern Railway. The station was situated on the south side of Hexham Road on the B6317. Freight traffic served collieries, coke-ovens, brickworks, paper mills, dairy farms and the livestock market at Blackhill. This declined during the Second World War. After the war, the station failed to recover its passenger numbers, so it inevitably closed on 2 November 1953. As the road traffic became more efficient, freight traffic declined until it ceased on 7 March 1960. An excursion train later ran to Whitley Bay on 16 June 1962.

References

External links 

Disused railway stations in Tyne and Wear
Former North Eastern Railway (UK) stations
Railway stations in Great Britain opened in 1868
Railway stations in Great Britain closed in 1953
1868 establishments in England
1960 disestablishments in England